Janie Fricke is a self-titled studio album by American country artist Janie Fricke. It was released in 1991 on Intersound Records and contained 11 tracks. The eponymous disc was the sixteenth studio recording of Fricke's career and her first with the Intersound label. The album included two singles that were spawned in 1991. The second single "I Want to Grow Old with You" reached the Canadian country chart in 1991.

Background and content
In 1989, Fricke's final album with Columbia Records was released titled Labor of Love. With limited commercial attention to her music, the label dropped her in 1990 and Fricke signed with the smaller Intersound Records in 1991. Her first album project with the label would be an eponymous disc in 1991. It was recorded at the House of David, a studio located in Nashville, Tennessee. The sessions for the album were produced by Gilles Godard and Randy Jackson (Fricke's husband at the time). A total of 11 tracks comprised the album. Three of the album's songs were composed by Gilles Godard: "Greater Than Love", "I Want to Grow Old with You" and "I Know a Good Love (When I Lose One)". It also included a cover version of "Love Letters" which was originally a top ten pop hit for Ketty Lester in 1962.

Release and singles
Janie Fricke was first released in 1991 on Intersound Records. It was Fricke's first release with the label and her sixteenth album issued in her career. The album was distributed as a compact disc. The album was not reissued digitally. However, five tracks from the original recording later appeared on 2019's The Best of Janie Fricke. The album was sold to digital markets through 2019 Entertainment One. The remaining five tracks from the original 1991 release were included on The Best of Janie Fricke, Vol. 2, which was released through the same platforms. The album spawned two singles. Its first song to be issued as a single was "You Never Crossed My Mind". The track was released as a CD single was promoted to Canadian country markets in 1991. "I Want to Grow Old with You" was also released as a single from the project in 1991. It reached Canada's RPM Country Songs chart in 1991 and peaked at number 74. It was Fricke's last single to reach a RPM position.

Track listing

Personnel
All credits are adapted from the liner notes of Janie Fricke.

Musical personnel
 Janie Fricke - lead and backing vocals
 David Briggs – keyboards, piano
 Mark Casstevens – acoustic guitar, harmonica, mandolin
 Sonny Garrish – steel guitar
 Jana King – backing vocals
 Jerry Kroon – drums
 Larry Paxton – bass
 Brent Rowan – lead guitar
 Williams Warren – backing vocals
 Tony Wiggins – backing vocals
 John Willis – acoustic guitar, dobro, lead guitar, mandolin (plectrum tunning)
 Dennis Wilson – backing vocals

Technical personnel
 Laurie Anderson – package design
 David Briggs – session leader
 Jeff Carlton – studio relations
 Michael Corbett – assistant engineer
 Gilles Goddard – executive producer, producer
 Tom Hitchcock – engineer
 Randy Jackson – executive producer
 Montage Studios – photography
 Michael Olsen – package design

Release history

References

1991 albums
Janie Fricke albums